Blowers is a surname, and may refer to:

 Andrew Blowers (born 1975), New Zealand rugby union player
 Bruce G. Blowers (born 1987), American singer-songwriter 
 John G. Blowers Jr. (1911–2006), American drummer
 Mike Blowers (born 1965), American baseball player
 Sampson Salter Blowers (1742–1842), American lawyer
 Sean Blowers (born 1961), English actor
 Blowers, nickname of Henry Blofeld (born 1939),  British sports journalist

See also
 Blower (disambiguation)